Buch is a municipality in the district of Neu-Ulm in Bavaria in Germany.

References

Neu-Ulm (district)